Broadway is an unincorporated community and census-designated place (CDP) located within Franklin Township, in Warren County, New Jersey, United States, that was created as part of the 2010 United States Census. As of the 2010 Census, the CDP's population was 244.

Geography
According to the United States Census Bureau, the CDP had a total area of 0.371 square miles (0.962 km2), including 0.371 square miles (0.961 km2) of land and 0.000 square miles (0.000 km2) of water (0.03%).

Demographics

Census 2010

References

Census-designated places in Warren County, New Jersey
Franklin Township, Warren County, New Jersey